Punjab Public Library is a public library located in Lahore, Pakistan. It was established by order No. 2798 dated 8 November 1884 of the lieutenant governor of the Punjab, in the Home General Department. It has been registered under the Societies Registration Act of 1860.

History
The library began operations in the Baradari Wazir Khan, an imperial building built by Nawab Wazir Khan, the governor of Lahore, during Emperor Shahjahan’s reign with the assistance of the government of the Punjab. Its purpose is to be a public library and reading room.

Other library blocks were built in 1939, and a block housing the auditorium and Bait-ul-Quran section was constructed in 1968 and inaugurated by General Mohammad Musa, then governor of West Pakistan.

Govt. Punjab Public Library, Lahore, lies in the heart of the city of Lahore at Library Road near the Lahore museum, off Shahrah-e-Quaid-e-Azam. It is surrounded by educational institutions and the Punjab University (Old Campus). The commercial centre of Anarkali, the main offices of the Metropolitan Corporation Lahore (Town Hall) and the provincial government offices, i.e., the Civil Secretariat, are a short distance from this building.

The library holds a collection of books in all fields of knowledge in English, Urdu, Persian, Arabic and Punjabi. Its total collection is about 0.3 million volumes and includes books, bound volumes of back numbers of magazines/ newspapers, reports, the old gazettes of Punjab, Pakistan and undivided India, and more than 1500 manuscripts. The library receives 170 magazines, 24 journals by subscription and the rest as free copies. 12 dailies are received in the library.

Aims and objectives
 To provide a public library for the use of all classes of people in the province which contain official publications as well as general literature, both Oriental and Occidental.
 To provide a reading room open to the public, free of charge.
 To contribute to the intellectual advancement of the country.
 To make accessible at one place information that may be required for historical research, or for any other enquiry that depends upon records rather than upon experience.

Library administration
Govt. Punjab Public Library, Lahore, is under the administrative control of the Education Department, Government of the Punjab, Lahore. The Punjab government, vide notification No.SO(A-IV)2-24/2009 dated 25.02.2010, has constituted the following board of governors of the Government Punjab Public Library, Lahore, under the Punjab Government Educational and Training Institutions Ordinance, 1860 (West Pakistan Ordinance No.XI of 1960):-

Membership
Borrowing facilities are provided to the members only.

Sections
The library has the following sections:

Acquisition section

Used for acquiring books for the library from booksellers. The selection of books is made by a book purchase committee which also includes subject specialists. Readers’ suggestions are given consideration when purchasing books for the library. A book selection policy is followed for the purchase of books, and government procedures are followed for payment of the bills. Books are accessioned here, payments are made and the accessioned material is then sent to the technical section for processing. Suggestion books to be used for suggesting books for the library or making other proposals are provided.

Technical section

Books and other material received from the acquisition section are provided with labels and stamps and are classified and catalogued. D.D.C. 20th Edition is used for subject analysis while A.A.C.R-2 is followed for cataloguing. Cards are typewritten. Reference material is kept in the reference section and all other books are sent to the library shelves for circulation.

Circulation section

On the first floor of the English section there is an English counter at which books for home study are issued and received back. Oriental language books are issued at the counter in the Oriental section. Approximately 250 books are issued or received back at these counters every day.

Reference section

The Reference Section is frequented by students, research scholars and the public throughout the library working hours. It contains  reference works such as encyclopaedias, dictionaries, yearbooks, directories, almanacs, atlases, gazetteers, etc. along with reference works in subject fields. The official gazettes of Punjab and Pakistan kept in this section are important sources of information for many people of the city and rural areas of various districts of Punjab. Bound files of newspapers are available.

The section serves its readers by providing census reports, patents and designs, and back numbers of English magazines. This section is useful for students preparing for such competitive examinations as CSS and PCS. The section is staffed by library professionals and information specialists.

The Bait-ul-Quran

This section of the library was established in 1968 by Mr. Mukhtar Masood, then commissioner  of the Lahore Division, and inaugurated by then governor of West Pakistan, General Muhammad Musa. It contains manuscripts of the Quran, some dating back to 500 years. The section houses copies of handwritten and printed Qurans collected from all over Pakistan, e.g., the photocopies of the Quran remained under recitation of Usman Ghani, Amam Jaffer Sadiq, Molana Rom, Tipu Sultan and a hand written Quran by Aurangzeb Alamgir, Emperor of India. Translations and commentaries of the Quran in different languages and other Quranic Literature are all placed in this section for the use of research scholars. A mural painting by an artist of Pakistan, Mr. Shakir Ali, depicts Quranic Ayats in fine calligraphy and decorates the section.

Children's section

A separate children's section was established in March 1982. Material comprises illustrated books, children encyclopaedias and dictionaries, science and adventure books, illustrated fiction, biographies, historical and Islamic books, books on Quaid-e-Azam and Allama Muhammad Iqbal, as well as on Pakistan, both in English and Urdu languages. it contains about 6,000 volumes.

Oriental section

The section has about 125,000 volumes in Urdu, Persian, Arabic, Punjabi, Pushto, Sindhi, Balochi, etc.

Some rare books possessed by the section have been bound in cloth and leather. The building has now fallen short of its requirements with respect to additional books and the increasing number of readers .

Computer section and e-library

The computer section of the library was established in 1993 and became functional in 1996. A catalogue of the books in the library has been computerized and readers have been provided browsing facility on computers.

Internet service is provided to the public at a nominal charge of Rs. 10/- per hour. CD writing and printing is available in the section.

AVA Section

The section contains microfilm readers, microfilm reader/printers, TV and VCR equipment with more than 600 video films available. An LCD TV has been provided in the section by courtesy of the Punjab Library Foundation.

Other sections of the library are the:
 Bindery
 Account section
 Hindi, Gurumukhi, Sanskrit section
 Records section
 Gazetteer/gazette, report section
 Old newspaper & magazine section
 Braille section

Collections
Collections which have been donated are as follows:

Riffat Sultana Memorial Collection

This is the largest collection donated to this library by any individual. Dr. Mumtaz Hassan, a scholar and governor, State Bank of Pakistan, has donated about 9,000 volumes to the library in the memory of his daughter, Riffat Sultana. The collection has been placed in a  section known as the Riffat Sultana Memorial Collection. It has been functioning in the library since 1963.

Prof. Abdul Qadir Collection

Mulana Muhammad Ali Qasuri Collection

Abdul Hamid Collection

Dr. Azhar Ali Collection''

Facilities
Book reservation

Books can be reserved in both the English and Oriental sections of the library. As soon as a book which has been reserved is received back in the library, the borrower is informed of its availability.

Photocopying

The library has two photocopying machines for providing readers with photocopies of required material.

Library catalogue

Dictionary catalogues have been provided for the English and Oriental sections as well as the other collections of the library. Books can be searched by consulting the catalogues for authors, titles or subjects. The computerized catalogue is also available at the circulation desk.

Reader/reference services

Reader/reference assistance is available for students, readers and research scholars.

Cultural activities

To make the library a hub of cultural activities, a series of lectures has been started on educational, literary, Islamic and library topics for readers, students and scholars. Scholars and persons of repute are invited to deliver these lectures.

Classification scheme
For arrangement of reading material the Dewey Decimal Classification scheme is followed. The 19th edition of this scheme is being used along with AACR2 and the 15th edition of the Sears List of Subject Headings. Sometimes a number which is difficult to build from the 19th edition is built from the 20th edition.

Funding
The Punjab government provides an annual grant-in-aid amounting to Rs. 16 million. The other sources of income include nominal membership fees, etc.

Presidents of the Managing Committees

Librarians and Chief Librarians

References

Academic libraries in Pakistan
Libraries in Lahore